Through the Window is an album by the American music project Prurient, a performing name of artist Dominick Fernow. The three-song album was released on March 19, 2013 through the English label Blackest Ever Black. Though released in 2013, the tracks for Through the Window were recorded in October 2011 at the same time as Prurient's two Hydra Head Records releases — the studio album Bermuda Drain (2011) and the EP Time's Arrow (2011) — and were noted for musically showing more techno influences, akin to one of Fernow's other projects, Vatican Shadow.

Track listing
 "Through the Window" – 17:40
 "Terracotta Spine" – 3:51
 "You Show Great Spirit" – 10:11

Personnel
Through the Window personnel adapted from AllMusic.

Music
 Dominick Fernow

Production
 Matt Colton – cut
 Dominick Fernow – producing
 Kris Lapke – engineering, mastering, mixing, producing

Artwork and packaging
 Tim Cadiente – photography
 Dominick Fernow – art direction
 Juan Mendez – photography
 Nikolai Saveliev – art direction
 Oliver Smith – design

References

External links
 Through the Window on Bandcamp

2013 albums
Prurient albums